Jinat is a Bangladeshi film actress. She received Bangladesh National Film Award for Best Supporting Actress in 1986 for Shuvoda.

Selected filmography
 Shuvoda
 Nyay Onyay
 Kusum Koli

Awards and nominations

References

Living people
Bangladeshi film actresses
Best Supporting Actress National Film Award (Bangladesh) winners
Year of birth missing (living people)